Tze'elim is a kibbutz in southern Israel. Located in the Negev desert, it falls under the jurisdiction of Eshkol Regional Council. A military training base of the ground forces of the IDF (often named "Tze'elim Base") is located nearby.

History

The kibbutz was founded in January 1947 by gar'in from Jewish youth movements in Eastern Europe and North Africa, and was named for the abundant acacia trees in the area, which were mistakenly identified as the biblical Tze'elim trees. During the 1948 Arab–Israeli War the kibbutz was used as a military base. Many of the Selvino children were settled in the kibbutz.

Economy
Today the kibbutz markets itself as a tourist destination, with a natural hot springs spa and accommodation. Other economic activities are agriculture and farming. 

A 120 MW solar power plant, Israel's largest to date, opened in the kibbutz in 2020.

The production plant for cleantech materials made out of unsorted garbage of the Israeli company UBQ Materials is located at the kibbutz.

Transport
Tze'elim is linked to the regional council by bus route 14, to Tel Aviv by bus route 376, to Ofakim by bus route 30 and to Beersheba by bus route 130. All 4 bus routes are operated by Dan BaDarom. Tze'elim is situated off highway 222, in the north-western Negev.

Urban Warfare Training Center
In 2005, the Israeli Defense Forces, with assistance from the United States, built the Urban Warfare Training Center at the Tze'elim Army Base, at a cost of $45 million. Nicknamed "Baladia" (Arabic for "city"), it is a 7.4 square mile training center used to instruct soldiers in urban warfare techniques, and consists of an imitation Middle Eastern style city with multiple multistory buildings. It has been used to train various military organizations, including the US Army and UN peacekeepers. The project was developed in response to the need for greater urban warfare training amongst the IDF, following the conflict during the Second Intifada.

References

External links and references
Official website 
Urban Warfare Training Center – Simulating the Modern Battle-Field, IDF 2011
Israeli MOUT Facility Model for National Guard globalsecurity.org 2008
Video Vice.com
Tze'elim Negev Information Centre

Kibbutzim
Kibbutz Movement
Populated places established in 1947
1947 establishments in Mandatory Palestine
Populated places in Southern District (Israel)
North African-Jewish culture in Israel